The 2005 Australian Drivers' Championship was a CAMS sanctioned national motor racing title for drivers of cars conforming to Formula 3 regulations. It was the first time Formula 3 had contested the Australian Drivers' Championship, with Formula Holden/Formula Brabham/Formula 4000 being demoted from ADC status after 16 years. The title was contested over an eight-round, 16 race series with the winner awarded the 2005 CAMS Gold Star. The series, which was officially known as the Kumho Tyres Australian Formula 3 Championship for the Australian Drivers' Championship, was organised and administered by Formula 3 Australia Inc. It is recognised by the Confederation of Australian Motor Sport as the 49th Australian Drivers' Championship and as the fifth Australian Formula 3 Championship.

Aaron Caratti won the series driving a Dallara F304-Renault. Caratti won eight of the 16 races and finished 32 points ahead of nearest rival, Michael Trimble (Dallara F304). The margin to third place was again 32 points with Chris Alajajian (Dallara F304-Renault) filling the position. In addition to Caratti's eight race wins, Trimble took four wins and Alajajian two with single victories being taken by returning former F3 champion Michael Caruso (Dallara F301 Alfa Romeo) and Ian Dyk (Dallara F304 Opel).

Calendar
The championship was contested over an eight-round series with two races per round.

Class structure
Cars competed in two classes:
 Formula 3 Championship - for cars constructed in accordance with the FIA Formula 3 regulations that applied in the year of manufacture between 1 January 1995 and 31 December 2004.
 Formula 3 Trophy Class - for cars constructed in accordance with the FIA Formula 3 regulations that applied in the year of manufacture between 1 January 1995 and 31 December 1998.

The relevant FIA Formula 3 regulations were subject to specific amendments for Australian competition, as outlined in the championship regulations.

Points system
Formula 3 Championship points were awarded on a 20–15–12–10–8–6–4–3–2–1 basis for the first ten Championship class places in each race. One bonus point was awarded to the driver attaining pole position for the Championship class for each race. One bonus point was awarded to the driver setting the fastest Championship class race lap in each race, provided that the driver was a classified finisher in that race.

Trophy Class points were awarded on the same basis as Formula 3 Championship points.

Championship results

References

Australian Drivers' Championship
Drivers' Championship
Australian Formula 3 seasons
Australia
Australian Formula 3